C21 is a secondary route in Namibia that runs from Maltahöhe to Hoachanas via Kalkrand.

References

Roads in Namibia